The 2020 Summer Olympic women's football final was a football match that took place at International Stadium Yokohama in Yokohama, Japan, on 6 August 2021 to determine the winner of women's football tournament at the 2020 Summer Olympics. Canada won their first gold medal by defeating Sweden 3–2 in the penalty shoot-out after both teams drew 1–1 after extra time in the final.

Venue

The final was originally scheduled to be held at the Japan National Stadium in Tokyo at 11:00 local time. Both teams requested a later kickoff time due to concerns about excessive heat; as the National Stadium was already booked for athletics events in the evening, the game was moved to 21:00 local time at the International Stadium Yokohama in Yokohama.

Route to the final

Match

Details

Statistics

Viewership
Despite taking place early in the morning in Canada, the game was viewed by 4.4 million Canadians on CBC Television, making it the most watched event of the games in Canada.

References

External links
 Sweden 🇸🇪 vs Canada 🇨🇦 | Women's Football ⚽️🥇 Gold Medal Match | Tokyo Replays

Football at the 2020 Summer Olympics – Women's tournament
Sweden women's national football team matches
Canada women's national soccer team matches
Association football penalty shoot-outs